John Kraft was the Dean of the Warrington College of Business at the University of Florida from 1990 to 2020. Prior to his position at the Warrington College of Business, he was the Dean of Arizona State University Business School from 1986 through 1990.

Education
 Ph.D. in Economics from the University of Pittsburgh in 1971.

External links
  Faculty Page for Dr. Kraft

Living people
University of Pittsburgh alumni
University of Florida faculty
Year of birth missing (living people)